Harold Rowe Holbrook Jr. (February 17, 1925 – January 23, 2021) was an American film, stage actor, and television director. He was notable for his one-man stage show as Mark Twain.

Holbrook made his film debut in Sidney Lumet's The Group (1966). He later gained international fame for his performance as Deep Throat in the 1976 film All the President's Men. He played Abraham Lincoln in the 1976 miniseries Lincoln. He has also appeared in such films as Julia (1977), The Fog (1980), Creepshow (1982), Wall Street (1987), The Firm (1993), Hercules (1997), and Men of Honor (2000). 

Holbrook's role as Ron Franz in Sean Penn's Into the Wild (2007) earned him both Screen Actors Guild Award and Academy Award nominations for Best Supporting Actor.

In his later career, Holbrook appeared as Francis Preston Blair in Steven Spielberg's Lincoln (2012), provided his voice as Mayday in the Disney animated film Planes: Fire & Rescue (2014) and as Whizzer in Blackway (2015).

Films

Television

References

Male actor filmographies
American filmographies